KNGS-LP is a low-power radio station broadcasting out of Hanford, California. It is licensed to the First Unitarian Universal Life Church of Hanford.

History
KNGS-LP started broadcasting on October 15, 2015, as KOOH-LP at 104.5 MHz. It moved to 100.7 MHz in 2020 because of interference caused when Fresno translator K283CY (for KWRU (1300 AM)) began broadcasting.

References

External links
 

NGS-LP
NGS-LP
Radio stations established in 2015
2015 establishments in California
Hanford, California
Classic hits radio stations in the United States